Steven Nelson (born June 4, 1988) is an American professional boxer who has held the WBO-NABO super middleweight title since January 2020.

Professional career
Nelson made his professional debut on March 19, 2016, scoring a first-round technical knockout (TKO) victory over Billy Colon at the Arena Theatre in Houston, Texas.

After compiling a record of 15–0 (12 KOs) he fought for his first professional title, facing Cem Kilic for the vacant WBO-NABO super middleweight title on January 11, 2020 at the Hard Rock Live in Atlantic City, New Jersey. Nelson captured the title via eighth-round TKO after Kilic's trainer, Buddy McGirt, climbed onto the ring apron to ask referee David Fields to stop the fight to save Kilic from further punishment. Fields obliged and called a halt to the contest at 1 minute 44 seconds into the round. At the time of the stoppage, Nelson had won every round on the judges' scorecards, leading with 70–63.

Professional boxing record

References

External links

Living people
1988 births
American male boxers
Super-middleweight boxers
Light-heavyweight boxers
African-American boxers
Boxers from Nebraska
Sportspeople from Omaha, Nebraska
21st-century African-American sportspeople
20th-century African-American people